Nizāmī is a crater on Mercury. Its name was adopted by the International Astronomical Union (IAU) in 1979. Nizami is named for the Persian poet Nizami Ganjavi, who lived from 1141 to 1209.

References

Impact craters on Mercury